The Collected Stories of Philip K. Dick is a collection of 118 science fiction stories by American writer Philip K. Dick.  It was first published by Underwood-Miller in 1987 as a five volume set. See Philip K. Dick bibliography for information about the mass market reprints.

Many of the stories had originally appeared in the magazines Fantasy and Science Fiction, Planet Stories, If, Galaxy Science Fiction, Imagination, Space Science Fiction, Fantastic Story Magazine, Amazing Stories, Future Science Fiction, Cosmos, Fantasy Fiction, Beyond Fantasy Fiction, Thrilling Wonder Stories, Startling Stories, Fantastic Universe, Science Fiction Quarterly, Astounding, Science Fiction Adventures, Science Fiction Stories, Orbit, Satellite Science Fiction, Imaginative Tales, Fantastic, Worlds of Tomorrow, Escapade, Famous Science Fiction, Niekas, Rolling Stone College Papers, Interzone, Playboy, Omni and The Yuba City High Times.

Contents

Volume I, Beyond Lies the Wub
 Preface from a letter to John Betancourt
 Foreword by Steven Owen Godersky
 Introduction by Roger Zelazny
 Stability
 Roog
 The Little Movement
 Beyond Lies the Wub
 The Gun
 The Skull
 The Defenders
 Mr. Spaceship
 Piper in the Woods
 The Infinites
 The Preserving Machine
 Expendable
 The Variable Man
 The Indefatigable Frog
 The Crystal Crypt
 The Short Happy Life of the Brown Oxford
 The Builder
 Meddler
 Paycheck
 The Great C
 Out in the Garden
 The King of the Elves
 Colony
 Prize Ship
 Nanny
 Notes

Volume II, Second Variety
 Introduction by Norman Spinrad
 The Cookie Lady
 Beyond the Door
 Second Variety
 Jon's World
 The Cosmic Poachers
 Progeny
 Some Kinds of Life
 Martians Come in Clouds
 The Commuter
 The World She Wanted
 A Surface Raid
 Project: Earth
 The Trouble with Bubbles
 Breakfast at Twilight
 A Present for Pat
 The Hood Maker
 Of Withered Apples
 Human Is
 Adjustment Team
 The Impossible Planet
 Impostor
 James P. Crow
 Planet for Transients
 Small Town
 Souvenir
 Survey Team
 Prominent Author
 Notes

Volume III, The Father-Thing
 Introduction by John Brunner
 Fair Game
 The Hanging Stranger
 The Eyes Have It
 The Golden Man
 The Turning Wheel
 The Last of the Masters
 The Father-Thing
 Strange Eden
 Tony and the Beetles
 Null-O
 To Serve the Master
 Exhibit Piece
 The Crawlers
 Sales Pitch
 Shell Game
 Upon the Dull Earth
 Foster, You’re Dead
 Pay for the Printer
 War Veteran
 The Chromium Fence
 Misadjustment
 A World of Talent
 Psi-Man Heal My Child!
 Notes

Volume IV, The Days of Perky Pat
 "How Do You Know You're Reading Philip K. Dick?", by James Tiptree, Jr.
 "Autofac"
 "Service Call"
 "Captive Market"
 "The Mold of Yancy"
"The Minority Report"Recall Mechanism"
"The Unreconstructed M"
 "Explorers We"
 "War Game"
 "If There Were No Benny Cemoli"
 "Novelty Act"
 "Waterspider"
 "What the Dead Men Say"
 "Orpheus with Clay Feet"
 "The Days of Perky Pat"
 "Stand-by"
 "What'll We Do with Ragland Park?"
 "Oh, to Be a Blobel!"
 Notes

Volume V, The Little Black Box
 Introduction by Thomas M. Disch
 "The Little Black Box"
 "The War with the Fnools"
 "A Game of Unchance"
 "Precious Artifact"
 "Retreat Syndrome"
 "A Terran Odyssey"
 "Your Appointment Will Be Yesterday"
 "Holy Quarrel"
 "We Can Remember It for You Wholesale"
 "Not By Its Cover"
 "Return Match"
 "Faith of Our Fathers"
"The Story to End All Stories for Harlan Ellison’s Anthology Dangerous Visions"
 "The Electric Ant"
 "Cadbury, the Beaver Who Lacked"
 "A Little Something for Us Tempunauts"
 "The Pre-persons"
 "The Eye of the Sibyl"
 "The Day Mr. Computer Fell out of its Tree"
 "The Exit Door Leads In"
 "Chains of Air, Web of Aether"
 "Strange Memories of Death"
 "I Hope I Shall Arrive Soon"
 "Rautavaara's Case"
 "The Alien Mind"
 Notes

Missing Short Stories
The following stories are ones that were left out of this collection.
 "Goodbye, Vincent"
 "Menace React" (only a fragment remains and it was published after the collection)
 "Time Pawn"

Publication states
The set was published in four states:  
 3 copies were quarterbound in calfskin with a handmade slipcase and the author's signature tipped in.
 100 copies were bound in red buckram, slipcased, with the author's signature taken from his canceled checks, laid in.
 405 copies were bound in tan and brown cloth, slipcased, but without signature. (400 of these are numbered from 101–500 and 5 are presentation copies.)
 800 copies were bound with a yellow-orange binding and did not have a slipcase.

The volumes were not sold individually.  All sets except the trade edition (800 copies) also included a chapbook, "Brief Synopsis for An Alternate World Novel: The Acts of Paul'', an outline for a novel that was never written.

Sources

1987 short story collections
Short story collections by Philip K. Dick